The Shadow Cabinet of Ahmad Zahid Hamidi was established on 26 September 2018. The purpose of this Shadow Cabinet is to provide a check and balance role for Mahathir Mohamad's Pakatan Harapan coalition, which formed a government (with the confidence and supply of WARISAN and UPKO) on 10 May 2018.

History 
Barisan Nasional (BN), under the second-term leadership of then UMNO president Najib Razak, was defeated in the 14th General Election and became the Opposition in the Parliament for the first time in Malaysian history. Rembau Member of Parliament (MP) Khairy Jamaluddin promised a shadow cabinet if he was elected UMNO president. He made such a promise to demonstrate the ability of BN to be a formidable opposition in the Parliament. But the majority of UMNO divisions elected former deputy prime minister Ahmad Zahid Hamidi as president. He was later formalised by the Parliament as Leader of the Opposition replacing current Deputy Prime Minister Wan Azizah Wan Ismail.

Khairy continued to call for the establishment of a shadow cabinet from Zahid despite being defeated in the UMNO presidential election. Khairy had even claimed that BN has established a shadow cabinet and its MPs were given portfolios, which was confirmed by UMNO secretary-general, Ketereh MP Annuar Musa, on 26 July. However, this claim was dismissed by Zahid on 4 August.

In previous parliamentary terms, Malaysia has never had a shadow cabinet. Then Pakatan Rakyat leader Anwar Ibrahim appointed a Frontbench Committee in the 12th Parliament, and DAP appointed spokespersons among MPs in the 13th Parliament, but never a full shadow cabinet.

Details 
Barisan Nasional (BN), as the largest opposition coalition in the Parliament, established a Shadow Cabinet on 26 September 2018.  Each portfolio established in this Shadow Cabinet will also be comprising three professionals connected to their fields, including Women and Youth members, who will be elected at a later date. 

The current Shadow Cabinet is the first-ever to be formed in the history of Malaysia, by the largest opposition coalition of Barisan Nasional consisting of UMNO, MIC and MCA. This Shadow Cabinet is led by Leader of the Opposition Ahmad Zahid Hamidi and applies the Portfolio Committee system. The sole Member of Parliament (MP) from the PBRS is the only other representative even though UMNO Secretary-General Annuar Musa has encouraged MPs from the Sarawak Parties Alliance, Malaysian Islamic Party and United Alliance (Sabah) to join the committee.

The only portfolio from the actual Cabinet of Malaysia not to have a counterpart in this Shadow Cabinet is National Unity and Social Well-being.

As of 14 December 2018, the Shadow Cabinet consists of the 38 following opposition MPs:

 (36)
 (1)
 (1)

 Cluster 1: Prime Minister's Office, Law, Human Resources and Security 

 Cluster 2: Finance, the Economy and Industry 

 Cluster 3: Education, Social and Culture 

 Cluster 4: Infrastructure, Technology and Health

Changes

References

See also 

 Seventh Mahathir cabinet
 Cabinet of Malaysia
 Shadow Cabinet of Malaysia

Malaysian shadow cabinets
Politics of Malaysia